Eino Richard Erwin Kotanen (November 18, 1925 – September 9, 2011) was a Canadian professional ice hockey defenceman who played in one National Hockey League game for the New York Rangers during the 1950–51 NHL season.

Kotanen died on September 9, 2011.

See also
List of players who played only one game in the NHL

References

External links

1925 births
2011 deaths
Canadian ice hockey defencemen
Canadian people of Finnish descent
Ice hockey people from Ontario
New York Rangers players
New York Rovers players
Sportspeople from Thunder Bay
Canadian expatriate ice hockey players in the United States